The 1955 Cal Poly San Dimas Broncos football team represented the Cal Poly Kellogg-Voorhis Unit—now known as California State Polytechnic University, Pomona—as an independent during the 1955 college football season. Led by Staley Pitts in his third and final season as head coach, Cal Poly San Dimas compiled a record of 4–3. The team was outscored by its opponents 120 to 102 for the season.

Schedule

References

Cal Poly San Dimas
Cal Poly Pomona Broncos football seasons
Cal Poly San Dimas Broncos football